Rolf Wilhelm Albert Sachs (born August 10, 1955 in Lausanne, Switzerland) is a Swiss artist, designer, art collector and philanthropist.

Biography

Early life 
Sachs was born August 10, 1955 in Lausanne, Switzerland. His parents were industrial heir Gunter Sachs and his first wife Anne-Marie Faure (1934-1958) who died early from anesthesia error during an operation. He has Swiss and German dual citizenship. His grandfather was German industrialist Willy Sachs who was the majority owner of Fichtel & Sachs. His great-grandfather was Wilhelm von Opel, the son of Opel company founder Adam Opel. He was educated at Institute Le Rosey and the Lyceum Alpinum Zuoz. From 1975 he started to study economics in London and San Francisco. He holds a Bachelor's degree in Business Administration from Menlo College in Menlo Park, California.

Career 
He started his formal career in investment banking before fully committing to the art world. Since 1984 he is also active as furniture designer and since 2006 also as a set designer (theater and movies). He moved to London in 1994 and founded his design studio rolf sachs fun'ction there. According to his own statements, he was heavily influenced by Suprematism, Dadaism, Surrealism, the Nouveau Réalisme group of artists and the artist Joseph Beuys. His penchant for chairs follows on from an extensive collection of chairs begun in the late 1980s. A large special exhibition with design objects that deal with German virtues took place in 2014 in the Museum for Applied Arts in Cologne.

Additionally after his studies he briefly worked for his family's company as specialist and investor for 'alternative investments'. He is still active in the world of finance and investments through his single family office galaxar ag which has offices in Chur and Zug. Also he holds several advisory and board member positions on a national and international level.

Family 
Since 1985 he was married to Iranian-born Maryam Banihashem. They had three children; Philipp, Frederick and Roya Sachs. In 2014 they made their separation public. Since then he has been in a relationship with Mafalda Princess of Hesse. Sachs currently resides in London, United Kingdom.

Art and design

Rolf Sachs's work moves between art and design, objects, spaces and visual medium. It encourages his audience to question preconceptions and view objects from a different perspective, through an inquisitive and conceptual approach. 

Sachs’ work was initially inspired by the principles of minimalism. Restrained decoration, deconstructed right angles and sharp corners were the defining characteristics of his work, predominantly made from felt and solid wood.

His work has changed over the years, becoming more experimental and conceptual and therefore not as definable. He searches for the unconventional and the unexpected, a philosophy reflected in his artistic style.

Rolf Sachs has exhibited at numerous art and design galleries including the MAKK Museum in Cologne, Galerie von Bartha in St Moritz, the Victoria & Albert Museum in London, ammann// gallery at Design Miami Basel, Phillips de Pury & Company New York, Monica Sprüth Cologne and Faggionato Fine Arts in London. His set designs the Faust opera, which debuted at Wiesbaden Staatstheater and the Faust ballet at  the Les Ballets de Monte Carlo, which toured globally. In March 2009, Sachs completed the set design for Vincenzo Bellini’s “Norma” at the Opera de Monte Carlo.

Rolf collaborated with his stepmother Maryam Sachs on developing the concept for the  photographic project entitled The Wild Emperor where over a period of a year, a stationary camera captured the Wild Kaiser mountain range outside his house in Bavaria, in 10.5 minute intervals.

At the end of September 2016, Sachs published a yearlong photographic exploration on the UNESCO World Heritage Rhaetian Albula / Bernina Railway line, entitled Camera in Motion: From Chur to Tirano. In this recent project Sachs's photographs were taken from a moving train. These images uncover Sachs’s experimental approach to photography and challenge the viewer to step towards an unknown reality. The book features 87 photographs and includes texts by Bill Kouwenhoven and Helen Chislett, and is published by Kehrer Verlag.

In October 2016, Sachs designed the Leica M-P (Typ 240) special edition 'grip' by Rolf Sachs, in collaboration with Leica Camera AG. The new, limited edition, model unites the iconic rangefinder technology with artistic product design with a combination of unusual materials and the artist’s signature bright red colour palette.

External links 
  Rolf Sachs Website
  "Rolf Sachs covers Leica camera in ping-pong rubber" Dezeen Website, 13 October 2016
 "Photo finish: Rolf Sachs designs a ping pong rubber-cased camera for Leica" Wallpaper* website, 14 October 2016
 Camera in Motion: From Chur to Tirano
  'In-pulse!' by Rolf Sachs Studio, Milan Wallpaper* website, 19 April 2011
  Rolf Sachs Studio Invitations Wallpaper* website, 19 April 2011
  Salone: Rolf Sachs Whitewall website, 18 April 2011
  ''Rolf Sachs discusses 'In-Pulse!''' Vogue.it, 14 April 2011
  Rolf Sachs: curiosities - dome light series Design Boom website, 28 June 2010
  Alone in a crowd by Rolf Sachs Dezeen website, 25 June 2010
  Alone in a crowd table by Rolf Sachs Mocoloco website, 24 June 2010
  “flawless/imperfection” by Rolf Sachs Artslope website, 13 April 2010
  ''Rolf Sachs smart car 'sprinkle''' Design Boom website, 30 March 2010
  Rolfs Sachs Open Studio at LDF 2010
  Article by Caroline Roux, The Observer, Sunday 22 October 2006

1955 births
Living people
People from Lausanne
Swiss-German people
German artists
Alumni of Institut Le Rosey
Alumni of Lyceum Alpinum Zuoz